Hang Seng China A Industry Top Index (HSCAIT) is one of the Hong Kong stock market indexes produced by the Hang Seng Indexes Company Limited. HSCAIT was launched on 21 Sep 2009. It is used to reflect the performance of A-share index that captures all the industry leaders in mainland China. The performance of industry leaders in each of the 11 industries under the Hang Seng Industry Classification System is tracked through this index.

Features
Key features of HSCATT include the following:

Reflects the performance of leading companies in each of the 11 industries under the Hang Seng Industry Classification System 
It is the first A-share index that adopts both market capitalisation and fundamental factors such as revenues and net profits as the constituent stocks selection criteria
Up to a maximum of five companies are selected from each industry
It has a more balanced industry distribution and offers a more diversified exposure to the A-share market
Stocks are freefloat-adjusted with a 10% cap on each constituent

See also
Hang Seng Index
Hang Seng Composite Index

References

External links
Official website

Hang Seng Index
Hang Seng Bank stock market indices